Bayard is an organized hamlet in the RM of Terrell No. 101 in the Canadian province of Saskatchewan. It is located along Highway 715 approximately 4 km southwest of Claybank in the Dirt Hills. The area was populated by German immigrants primarily from Bukovina during the late 19th and early 20th century.

Population
Demographics

See also
 List of communities in Saskatchewan
 List of hamlets in Saskatchewan

References

Former designated places in Saskatchewan
Organized hamlets in Saskatchewan
Terrell No. 101, Saskatchewan
Division No. 3, Saskatchewan